The 2021 Professional Chess Association of the Philippines season is the inaugural season of the Professional Chess Association of the Philippines (PCAP), a professional chess league in the Philippines. The season opened on January 12, 2021.

There were three conferences or separate tournaments under the 2021 season. The first conference was the All-Filipino Conference. It was followed by the Reinforced and Open Conferences.

Teams
There are 24 teams in the PCAP as of the inaugural season divided into two geographic groups.

North
Antipolo Cobras
Laguna Heroes (Cabuyao)
Cagayan Kings
Caloocan Loadmanna Knights
Isabela Knight Raiders
Cavite Spartans (General Trias)
Manila Indios Bravos
Olongapo Rainbow Team 7
Pasig City King Pirates
Quezon City Simba's Tribe
Rizal Batch Towers
San Juan Predators

South
Camarines Soaring Eagles
Cebu City Machers
Cordova Dutchess Dagami Warriors
Iloilo Kisela Knights
Iriga City Oragons
Lapu-Lapu City Naki Warriors
Mindoro Tamaraws
Negros Kingsmen
Palawan–Albay Queens' Gambit
Surigao Fianchetto Checkmates
Toledo City Chess Miners
Zamboanga Sultans

Draft

Team changes

Name changes
 The Palawan Queens' Gambit changed their name to the Palawan–Albay Queens' Gambit starting the Open Conference.

All-Filipino Conference
The first tournament of the 2021 PCAP season was the All-Filipino Conference which began on January 16, 2021. The conference finals was held on April 3, 2021 which was contested by the Laguna Heroes of the Northern Division and the Camarines Soaring Eagles of the Southern Division. The Laguna Heroes clinched the title of PCAP's inaugural conference.

Regular season

Northern Division

Southern Division

Playoffs
Scores within parentheses are the result of the Armageddon play tiebreaker in either sets which ended in the draw or both teams having the same aggregate score after all sets have been played.

Northern Division

Southern Division

Grand finals

Awards
Best Player of the Conference: Jem Garcia (Caloocan)
Finals Most Valuable Player: Banjo Barcenilla (Laguna)

Reinforced Conference
The Reinforced Conference will also be known as the Wesley So Cup for this season due to sponsorship of Filipino-American chess player Wesley So himself. Each team would be allowed to field one foreign player; who may either be a rated, lady, or senior player. The same format from the All Filipino Conference will be used for the Reinforced Conference which is scheduled to begin on May 15.

Foreign players

Northern Division
 Jimmy Chee Meng Liew (Caloocan)
 Alexei Barsov (Cagayan)
 Wagish Kumar Rai (Cavite)
 Kirill Shevchenko (Laguna)
 Yosef Taher (Manila)
 Viktor Moskalenko (San Juan)
 Siew Kai Xin (Quezon City)
 Kevin Goh (Pasig)
 Gombosuren Munkhgal (Pasig)

Southern Division
 Marie Sebag (Camarines)
 Poompong Wiwatanadate (Cebu City)
 Nitzan Steinberg (Cordova)
 Hovhannes Gabuzyan(Iloilo)
 Phạm Lê Thảo Nguyên (Lapu-Lapu City)
 Fruzsina Szente-Varga (Mindoro)
 Steven Breckenridge (Negros)
 Padmini Rout (Palawan)
 Amir Bagheri (Toledo)
 Alexandr Fier (Zamboanga)

Regular season

Northern Division

Southern Division

Play-ins
The seventh to tenth best finishing teams in the regular season qualify for the play-ins. The seventh place team play against the tenth place team, and the eight place team play against the ninth place team. The lower seeded teams needed to beat the higher seeded team to advance.

Northern Division

Southern Division

Playoffs
Scores within parentheses are the result of the Armageddon play tiebreaker in either sets which ended in the draw or both teams having the same aggregate score after all sets have been played.

Northern Division

Southern Division

Third place playoff

Grand finals

Open Conference
Foreign teams were eligible to compete as guests for this tournament. The conference was also known as the PCAP/San Miguel Corporation-Ayala Land Premier Cup due to sponsorship reasons. The San Juan Predators won the conference.

Teams
The following are guest teams for the Open Conference.

Local guest teams
CCE Sunrays
Davao Executive Chess Society
Pampanga Checkers
Philippine national para chess team

Foreign guest teams
 Peng Cheng Dragons
 Penang Blue Panthers
 Team SinQGApore
 Double Bishop Bangkok

All-Star Game
An All-Star Game was held on May 2, 2021 following the conclusion of the All Filipino Conference which was contested by selection teams representing the North and South Divisions. The composition of the teams were determined through vote by both fans and the league's players and coaches. The Northern All Stars won over their Southern counterparts through an Armageddon tiebreaker.

Awards
Season MVP – Oliver Barbosa (San Juan)
Mythical Seven
Top-rated players
Oliver Barbosa (San Juan)
Jem Garcia (Caloocan)
Lady player – Jan Jodilyn Fronda (San Juan)
Senior player – Cris Ramayrat (Pasig / Manila)
Homegrown players
John Paul Gomez (Laguna)
John Michael Silvederio (Iloilo)
Fritz Bryan Porras (Iloilo)
Team Sportsmanship Award – Surigao Fianchetto Checkmates

References

Professional Chess Association of the Philippines season
Professional Chess Association of the Philippines season
Chess in the Philippines